Shenila Khoja-Moolji is the Hamad bin Khalifa al-Thani Associate Professor of Muslim Societies at Georgetown University. She is known for her scholarship on Muslims, gender, and Pakistan studies. She is a leading Shia Ismaili scholar.

Khoja-Moolji is the author of several books that have won awards from international academic associations. Her books include: Forging the Ideal Educated Girl: The Production of Desirable Subjects in Muslim South Asia (University of California Press, 2018); Sovereign Attachments: Masculinity, Muslimness, and Affective Politics in Pakistan (University of California Press, 2021); and Rebuilding Community: Displaced Women and the Making of a Shia Ismaili Muslim Sociality (Oxford University Press, 2023).

Early life and education 
Khoja-Moolji grew up in Hyderabad, Pakistan. She received a scholarship from the United World Colleges to do an International Baccalaureate. She then earned an undergraduate degree from Brown University, a Masters from Harvard University, and a doctorate from Columbia University.

Career 
Between 2016 and 2018, Khoja-Moolji was a postdoctoral and visiting scholar at the University of Pennsylvania’s Alice Paul Center for Research on Gender, Sexuality and Women. In 2018, she joined the Gender, Sexuality, and Women’s Studies program at Bowdoin College, where she earned early tenure and promotion within three and a half years. In 2022, Khoja-Moolji was appointed as the Hamad bin Khalifa al-Thani Associate Professor of Muslim societies, a tenured and endowed chair position, at Georgetown University.

Khoja-Moolji is known for her theorizations of Muslim girlhood, which includes several articles that analyze the portrayal of Malala Yousafzai and the politics of international development campaigns.     She is considered a pioneer and one of the earliest scholars to write Ismaili women into modern Ismaili history.

Her first book, Forging the Ideal Educated Girl: The Production of Desirable Subjects in Muslim South Asia, published by the University of California Press (2018), is a genealogy of the ‘educated girl.’ The book shows how girl’s education is a site of struggle for multiple groups—from national to religious elites—through which they construct gender, class, and religious identities. The book was published in the Islamic Humanities open-access series. The book won the 2019 Jackie Kirk Outstanding Book Award from the Comparative and International Education Society.

Her second book, Sovereign Attachments: Masculinity, Muslimness, and Affective Politics in Pakistan, also published the University of California Press (2021), re-theorizes sovereignty by drawing on affect, cultural, and religious studies. The book won the Best Book Award from the Theory section of the International Studies Association. The book also won the 2022 Best Book award from The Association for Middle East Women's Studies. 

Her third book, Rebuilding Community: Displaced Women and the Making of a Shia Ismaili Muslim Sociality published by Oxford University press (2023), is a first attempt to archive the lives of twentieth-century Ismaili women. The book follows Ismaili women who were displaced in the 1970s from East Africa and East Pakistan, to elaborate how they recreated their religious community in transit and in new regions of settlement, particularly North America.  

In 2019, Khoja-Moolji was elected to the South Asia Council of the Association for Asian Studies.

Khoja-Moolji is the recipient of multiple career awards: the Emerging Scholar Award from the Muslim Philanthropy Initiative based at Indiana University; the Early Career Award for Community Engagement from the International Studies Association’s Feminist Theory and Gender Studies section; and the Early Career Award from Teachers College, Columbia University. 

Khoja-Moolji regularly publishes in Al Jazeera and the Express Tribune to convey scholarly ideas to the public.

References 

Year of birth missing (living people)
Living people
Georgetown University faculty
Harvard University alumni
Brown University alumni
Columbia University alumni
Muslim writers
Women and education
21st-century Pakistani women writers
Women scholars of Islam
American Islamic studies scholars
20th-century Ismailis
Pakistani Ismailis
21st-century American women writers